Elections were held in Nebraska on November 2, 2010.  Primary elections for the Republican Party and Democratic Party, as well as a nonpartisan primary for members of the Nebraska Legislature, took place on May 11, 2010.

Federal

United States House

All three of Nebraska's seats in the United States House of Representatives will be up for election in 2010.  All three incumbents are Republican, and all three will be running for re-election.

State

Governor

Dave Heineman, the incumbent Republican governor, will seek reelection. In the Republican primary, Heineman faces Paul Anderson and Christopher Geary.  The winner of the Republican primary will face Democrat Mike Meister, a Scottsbluff lawyer, in the general election. Previously, Mark Lakers was forced to withdraw following a scandal concerning raising campaign funds.

Secretary of State
Nebraska's Secretary of State race pits incumbent Republican John A. Gale against Democrat Janet Stewart, an attorney practicing in Fremont.

State Treasurer
Nebraska's state treasurer race is for an open seat, as incumbent Shane Osborn is not running for reelection.  There are three candidates in the Republican primary: Don Stenberg, former Nebraska Attorney General, Tom Nesbitt, former State Patrol Superintendent, and State Senator Tony Fulton.  The winner of the Republican primary will face Democrat Mark Stoj, a credit union manager and company trainer with almost two decades of banking/finance experience, a master's degree in Business Management, and 12 years of office management experience, in the general election.

Attorney general
Jon Bruning, a Republican, is running uncontested for re-election as Nebraska Attorney General.

Auditor of Public Accounts
Mike Foley, a Republican, is running uncontested for re-election as Nebraska Auditor of Public Accounts.

Public Service Commissioners
Nebraskans will elect Public Service Commissioners for District 4 and District 5.  Both races feature contested Republican primaries.  In District 4, the candidates are Roger L. Bohrer, Rod Johnson, and Paul A. Rosberg.  In District 5, there are six candidates: Jerry Vap, Justin Jensen, Mike Delka, Kelly Renee Rosberg, Duane Dufek, and Christopher VanWinkle.  There are no Democratic candidates in either district.

State legislature
Half of the forty-nine seats of the unicameral and nonpartisan Nebraska Legislature will be up for election in 2010.  A non-partisan primary was held on May 11, 2010, in which the top two vote-getters in each district advanced to the general election.

Educational Offices
Four seats of the Nebraska State Board of Education are up for election in 2010.  In District 5, Patricia Timm is running unopposed.  In District 6, Lynn Cronk and Randy Klawitter are running.  In District 7, Cindi Allen and Molly O'Holleran are running.  In District 8, Dennis McIntyre and John Sieler are running.

Two seats for the Board of Regents, University of Nebraska, are up for election in 2010.  In District 6, Kent Schroeder is running unopposed.  In District 7, Current Regent Bob Phares, who is serving as chair this year, and challenger Frank Svoboda are running.  The winner will serve a six-year term.

Three seats are up for election for Community College Boards of Governors.  For the board of governors of Metropolitan Community College, District 3, there are three candidates: Jason Johanns, Gary Anderson, and James Monahan.  For District 5, there are three candidates: Steven Gabrowski, Mary Lou Schwope, and Frank Wellenstein.  For the board of governors of Southeast Community College, District 5, there are also three candidates: Jackie Allensworth, Terry Kubicek, and Toberlin Burger.

Natural Resources Districts
For the board of directors of the Central Platte Natural Resources District, Subdistrict 6, D. Scott Woodman, Kelly Markham, and Don Mehring are running.

For the board of directors of the Lower Loup Natural Resources District, Clifford P. Loseke, Brad Stephens, and Tom Knutson are running.

And for the board of directors of the Lower Platte South Natural Resources District, David M. Landis
Paul Morrison, and Edward C. Price are running.

Judicial positions
Multiple judicial positions will be up for election in 2010.
Nebraska judicial elections, 2010 at Judgepedia

Ballot measures
Amendment 1 (permit the development of real, personal property), the only ballot measure on the May 11 ballot, was approved by voters. Two ballot measures have been certified for the November 2 election:
Whether or not to abolish the position of the state treasurer
Change the powers of municipalities to fund sources for economic/industrial development.

Nebraska 2010 ballot measures at Ballotpedia

External links
Elections from the Nebraska Secretary of State
Candidates for Nebraska State Offices at Project Vote Smart
Nebraska Polls at Pollster.com

Nebraska Congressional Races in 2010 campaign finance data from OpenSecrets
Nebraska 2010 campaign finance data from Follow the Money
 Imagine Election – Find out which candidates will appear on your ballot – search by address or zip code.

 
Nebraska